The third season of Deutschland sucht den Superstar premiered on 16 November 2005 and continued until 18 March 2006. It was won by Tobias Regner. The season was co-hosted by Tooske Ragas and Marco Schreyl.

Finalists
(Ages stated at time of contest)

Top 20 Shows

1st Top 20 Show (Boys)
Menowin Fröhlich made it into the Top 20 Shows but was disqualified after he was sentenced to two years in jail for fraud and injury. Markus Derwall took his place in the competition. In season 7, Fröhlich auditioned for the show once again and made it to the final 2.

Bottom 4: Gian-Luca, Markus, Julian, Stephan

Eliminated: Gian-Luca, Markus, Julian

 The only reason that the percentiles are shown in this show because there was a mix up in the voting (Stephan Darnstaedt was declared to be leaving the show until cleared up that the host misread the card) and were later published after this show.

1st Top 20 Show (Girls)

Bottom 4: Angelika, Carolina, Selina, Laura

Eliminated: Angelika, Selina, Laura

2nd Top 20 Show (Boys)

Bottom 4: Didi, Stephan, Daniel, Fabian

Eliminated: Didi, Fabian

Advancing to the Top 10: Mike Leon, Nevio, Tobias, Daniel, Stephan

2nd Top 20 Show (Girls)

Bottom 4: Lena, Meri, Dascha, Sharyhan

Eliminated: Meri, Sharyhan

Advancing to the Top 10: Vanessa, Carolina, Anna-Maria, Dascha, Lena

Finals

Contestants 
Stephan Darnstaedt, born on 10 October 1987 was a contestant of the third season. Darnstaedt left DSDS just one day before the third 'theme show', being replaced by Didi Knoblauch. He was known to sing songs from boy bands. Darnstaedt was not a favorite of the competition and was in the bottom groups during both Top 20 shows. Nevertheless, he ranked in the top half of voting during the theme show before his departure.

Vanessa Jean Dedmon, born 28 April 1987 to Russel and Waltraud Dedmon was a semifinalist in the third season and was voted out in the Top 3 Show.

Carolina Escolano-Fernandez, born 19 March 1984 in Pforzheim, Germany, was a contestant in the third season. She is of Spanish descent.

Didi Knoblauch (a.k.a. Jamie Dwayne Knoblauch and of trans-sexual gender), was born Diana Knoblauch 15 December 1980 in Illerkirchberg/Baden-Württemberg, Germany. Knoblauch is a member of the rock 'n' roll cover band The Cash in Baden-Württemberg. Knoblauch was eliminated in the second Top 20 show but was brought back into the competition as Stephan Darnstaedt quit.

Dascha Semcov was born 30 March 1988 in Kishinev, Moldova. Prior to Superstar, Dascha had been in Germany for only 18 months. Her father Alexej and mother Diana moved from Moldova to Erfurt. Semcov performed in three musicals which includes Starlight Express. She is also performing part of the band Soul AG from Weimar.

Daniel Muñoz-Repko, born on 28 December 1983, was a contestant in the third season. Daniel is of mixed Spanish and Dutch ethnicity.

1st Theme Show: "Die größten Hits aller Zeiten" (Greatest Hits of All Time)

Bottom 3: Anna-Maria, Carolina, Stephan
Eliminated: Carolina
Judges' forecasts: Stephan (All)

2nd Theme Show: "Die größten Hits der 80er" (Greatest Hits of the 80s)
Original airdate: 10 March 2007

Bottom 3: Lena, Daniel Dascha
Eliminated: Dascha
Judges' forecasts: Daniel (Dieter, Heinz), Stephan (Sylvia)

3rd Theme Show: "Die größten Rock-Songs" (The Greatest Rock Songs)
Didi Knoblauch is there for Stephan Darnstaedt (withdrew)

Bottom 3: Daniel, Nevio, Lena
Eliminated: Lena
Judges' forecasts: Didi (Dieter), Lena (Sylvia, Heinz)

4th Theme Show: "Swing/Big Band"

Bottom 3: Didi, Daniel Nevio
Eliminated: Daniel
Judges' forecasts: Daniel (Dieter, Heinz), Didi (Sylvia)

5th Theme Show: "Liebeslieder" (Love Songs)

Bottom 3: Nevio, Anna-Maria, Tobias
Eliminated: Anna-Maria
Judges' forecasts: Didi (Dieter, Heinz), Anna-Maria (Sylvia)

6th Theme Show: "Nummer 1" (Number 1)

Bottom 3: Mike Leon, Didi, Vanessa
Eliminated: Didi
Judges' forecasts: Didi (All)

7th Theme Show: "Soul"

Bottom 3: Vanessa, Mike Leon, Nevio
Eliminated: Nevio
Judges' forecasts: Tobias (Dieter), Mike Leon (Sylvia, Heinz)

8th Theme Show: "Kuschelrock" (Soft Rock)

Bottom 3: All
Eliminated: Vanessa
Judges' forecasts: Tobias (Dieter), Vanessa (Heinz, Sylvia)

Final

Winner: Tobias
Runner-up: Mike Leon
Winner Forecast: Mike Leon (Dieter), Tobias (Heinz, Sylvia)

Semi-finals/finals elimination chart

Season 03
2005 German television seasons
2005 in German music
2006 German television seasons
2006 in German music